The names of most Brazilian states are based on Portuguese placenames, while others are based on indigenous (often Tupi–Guarani) and a few European languages.

See also
States of Brazil

References

Etymologies
Brazil
Brazil